The 1978 Chatham Cup was the 51st annual nationwide knockout football competition in New Zealand.

Early stages of the competition were run in three regions (northern, central, and southern), with the National League teams receiving a bye until the Fourth Round of the competition. In all, 144 teams took part in the competition. Note: Different sources give different numberings for the rounds of the competition: some start round one with the beginning of the regional qualifications; others start numbering from the first national knock-out stage. The former numbering scheme is used in this article.

Results

Third round

* Won on penalties by Metro (3-2), Nelson Suburbs (3-2), and Porirua United (4-2)

Fourth round

* Won on penalties by Nelson Suburbs (4-3). † Replayed match after Courier Rangers fielded ineligible player

Fifth round

Sixth Round

Semi-finals

The Final
The final was held outside one of the main centres for the first time, being played in Nelson. Manurewa won the competition for the first time since 1931, when they had played under the name "Tramurewa" (after a recent merger with Tramways FC). The gap of 47 years between trophies in this competition is still a record.

Manurewa's side was coached by John Adshead who four years later would steer New Zealand's national side to their first FIFA World Cup. The team included several top players, notably Dave Bright and goalkeeper Frank van Hattum; they were opposed by the previous year's champions, Nelson United, a team which boasted the presence of Kenny Cresswell, Peter Simonsen and Keith Mackay, among others.

The game's only goal came after 12 minutes. Nelson keeper Owen Nuttridge failed to completely clear a Dave Bright cross, only for the ball to be headed into the net by Bruce Foster.

Final

References

Rec.Sport.Soccer Statistics Foundation New Zealand 1978 page
UltimateNZSoccer website 1978 Chatham Cup page

Chatham Cup
Chatham Cup
Chatham Cup
September 1978 sports events in New Zealand